Volchy Rakit is a rural locality (a selo) in Ustyansky Selsoviet, Burlinsky District, Altai Krai, Russia. The population was 49 as of 2013. It was founded in 1939. There are 2 streets.

Geography 
Volchy Rakit is located 53 km east of Burla (the district's administrative centre) by road. Podsosnovo is the nearest rural locality.

References 

Rural localities in Burlinsky District